is a football (soccer) club based in Nakano, which is located in Nagano Prefecture in Japan. As of 2022, it plays in the Nagano Prefectural League 1st Division.

History
Nakano Football Club was founded in 1971: this name lasted for 29 years, before changing it again to Nagano Esperanza FC in 2001. The current denomination - Football Club Nakano Esperanza - came only in 2007, with the Spanish "Esperanza" standing for "hope" in English. The club's first logo also features Common kestrel, a type of bird that can be easily seen on Nagano Prefecture. They reached the second division of Hokushinetsu Football League in 2015, and got relegated on 2018, 
back to the first division of the Nakano Prefectural League. The club still hope to be in professional football on a long-term program. 

On 16 August 2022, the club's 51st anniversary. Nakano Esperanza unveiled its new logo. The crest was produced and designed by Millions Co. Ltd. The rose represents the flower of Nakano City. Red-coloured, it's designed to match the club's color. The designers' intention was to make the logo simple and timeless, under the era of modern and simple logos commonly replacing older, and more detailed ones.

Past Logos

League record

Current squad
.

References

External links
Official Site 

Football clubs in Japan
Sports teams in Nagano Prefecture
Association football clubs established in 1971
1971 establishments in Japan